Plagiothecium latebricola is a species of moss belonging to the family Plagiotheciaceae.

Synonym:
 Hypnum scitulum Austin
 Isopterygium latebricola (Schimp.) Delogne
 Philoscia latebricola (Schimp.) Berk.
 Plagiotheciella latebricola (Schimp.) M. Fleisch.

References

Hypnales